Redweed is a common name for several plants and may refer to:

Phytolacca americana, native to North America
Suaeda australis, native to Australia

See also
Red weed